Miguel Gatan Purugganan (November 18, 1931 – July 7, 2011) was a Filipino prelate of the Catholic Church who served as the Bishop of Ilagan. He is well remembered for having fought the human rights abuses of the Marcos dictatorship, and was honored by having his name inscribed on the Wall of Remembrance at the Philippines' Bantayog ng mga Bayani, which honors the heroes and martyrs who fought the dictatorship.

References

20th-century Roman Catholic bishops in the Philippines
People from Isabela (province)
1931 births
2011 deaths
Religious workers honored at the Bantayog ng mga Bayani
Northern Luzon during martial law under Ferdinand Marcos